Jeffrey Lynn Green (born September 6, 1962) is an American retired professional stock car racing driver and crew chief. He most recently worked for RSS Racing as the crew chief for their No. 28 car in the ARCA Menards Series, driven by Kyle Sieg, and also competed part-time in the NASCAR Xfinity Series as a start and park driver for the team.

Green's 1990 Nashville Speedway USA championship led to his first foray in NASCAR. For several years, he raced part time in the Busch Series before thriving as a full-time driver in 1995 and 1996. He then went through a two-year Cup stint with Diamond Ridge Motorsports and Felix Sabates.

Green returned to the Busch Series in 1999 for three seasons. He won the 2000 championship by 616 points, a series record which stood until 2006, and finished second in points twice. Green participated in IROC's 25th season in 2001 and has raced full time with four different Sprint Cup teams since 2002.

Personal and early life
Green was born in Owensboro, Kentucky on September 6, 1962, as the youngest of three brothers; Mark and David Green would also become NASCAR drivers. He currently resides in Davidson, North Carolina with his wife Michelle. In 2002, he and Mark founded The Green Foundation, a nonprofit charity assisting people with severe injuries and life-threatening illnesses.

Racing career

Early years
Green dominated the field to win the 1990 track championship at Nashville Speedway USA. In 22 races, he won 15 times and had only one finish below third. After the season, John Boatman approached Green about competing in the Autolite Platinum 200, a NASCAR Busch Series event taking place at Richmond International Raceway. Green would start 23rd and finish 22nd in the event, exceeding the team's goal of simply qualifying for the race.

Green ran a limited schedule from 1991 to 1994, sporadically appearing in Busch Series races and making Cup starts for Sadler Brothers and Junior Johnson in 1994. He became a full-time driver in the Busch Series in 1995 for Dale Earnhardt, Inc., and after consecutive Top 5 finishes in the points standings, he made a pair of Cup races for DEI in 1996. At the end of the season, he signed to drive the unsponsored No. 8 Chevy for Diamond Ridge Motorsports, and won his first career race at Las Vegas. He later made 20 Winston Cup series starts in 1997 for the No. 29 Cartoon Network-sponsored Chevrolet Monte Carlo, owned by Diamond Ridge, finishing just behind his brother David for Rookie of the Year honors. Green planned to race full time for the team in 1998, but only raced in the No. 29 for three of the first six races. He was later released by Diamond Ridge, who suspended operations for the Winston Cup team in an effort to focus on the Busch Series. Green substituted a race for Derrike Cope, and later signed a contract to drive the No. 46 First Union/The Money Store-sponsored Chevrolet, owned by Felix Sabates, for the rest of the year. Overall, he would race in 22 of 33 season events and finished 40th in points.

Busch Series
Green turned his focus back to the Busch Series afterwards, finishing in the Top 2 in points for the next three years. He finished in second place, 280 points behind Dale Earnhardt Jr., in 1999 driving the No. 32 Kleenex-sponsored Chevy for Progressive Motorsports. It was his first full-time Busch series season since 1996.

As his team became the No. 10 Nesquick/Nestlé-sponsored Chevy and was rebranded ppc Racing in 2000, Green became the heavy favorite to win the championship after Earnhardt and Matt Kenseth departed for the Winston Cup. After dueling with Todd Bodine for the points lead early in the season, Green pulled away with 14 consecutive Top 10 finishes, a streak which included five wins. At the end of the year, Green had won the Busch Series championship by 616 points over ppc Racing teammate Jason Keller. This final victory margin was the largest in series history until 2006. Green set a series record for most Top 5's in a season (25), and with David Green, the 1994 Busch Series champion, became the first brothers to both win NASCAR championships.

After the 2000 season, Green was again a championship favorite in the 2001 season after switching to Ford. He eventually caught up to Harvick and, with a win in the Carquest Auto Parts 300, Green took a 14-point lead over Harvick 14 races into the season. However, he would suffer a 29th and two 31st-place finishes in the next four races, crippling his chances in the points race as he fell to fourth-place, 302 points behind Harvick. Green finished 124 points behind Harvick and earned his second runner-up finish in three seasons. He had seven finishes outside the Top 20 compared to only two the previous season. In all, during his three-year full-time return to the Busch Series, Green had 13 wins and 72 Top 10s — both the most of any driver during that period — and averaged three Top 10's in every four races. Later that season Green began driving for Richard Childress Racing part time in the No. 30 America Online-sponsored Chevrolet in Winston Cup (oddly enough as a replacement for Harvick, who was supposed to drive this car before the death of Dale Earnhardt caused him to be promoted to Childress' Winston Cup team much earlier than planned). Green competed in eight races, winning one pole and scoring one Top 10 finish. After the season, he left the Busch Series to drive for Childress full time.

Cup Series
In Green's first full Winston Cup season in 2002, he picked up four Top 5 finishes, and six Top 10s to finish 17th in points. One of these finishes which was his best career finish in the New England 300, finishing second to race winner Ward Burton. The runner-up finish brought him up to 18th in the points standings, and Green stayed in the Top 20 for the rest of the year.

Green began 2003 by winning the pole for the Daytona 500 and had a seventh-place finish at Texas Motor Speedway, but otherwise failed to finish higher than 20th and crashed twice. After an incident with teammate Harvick at Richmond, Richard Childress Racing fired Green on May 5. Two days later, he was picked up by DEI to drive the No. 1 Pennzoil-sponsored Chevrolet, replacing Steve Park, who was hired by Childress to drive the No. 30. Green fared no better than 16th in 12 races and was replaced by John Andretti. He was also replaced in the road-course races by Ron Fellows. In reaction, Green said he was not given the opportunity to improve the situation. After missing three races, Green drove the No. 43 Cheerios/Betty Crocker-sponsored Dodge Intrepid for Petty Enterprises in the Dover 400 after the original driver, Christian Fittipaldi, had a commitment to drive the No. 44 in four races. After driving the Dodge again in the EA Sports 500 the next week, he became the driver for the rest of the season on a race-to-race basis. Green's best finish with the team was 16th at Dover International Speedway; team owner Richard Petty expressed anticipation that the team could work well together after a few months. Green finished 34th in the points standings, and was signed to drive full time for the team for the next season.

Green had four Top 15 finishes in 2004 (including a seventh-place finish in the Subway 500) and he would fail to finish in 11 races, the most DNF's in one season of his career; five were caused by engine failures while the other six were caused by crashes. The eventual 30th-place finish in the standings remains the lowest result for Green in a full-time season. He would continue to struggle in 2005. He failed to finish in the Top 10 the entire year, with his best finish being 11th in the Coca-Cola 600. Green's 29th-place finish allowed Petty Enterprises to announce on November 11, 2005, that Bobby Labonte would replace him following the season's end.

Green signed with Haas CNC Racing and became the successor of Mike Bliss in the No. 66 Best Buy-sponsored Chevrolet, which had been changed from No. 0 to celebrate the sponsor's 40th anniversary. His new crew chief was Robert "Bootie" Barker, who had been subject to rumors of replacement before the 2006 season. In the Daytona 500, Green crashed midway through the race when Dale Jarrett clipped the right-rear of his car; Green would call this "stupid" and a "rookie" move. He rebounded from the 42nd-place finish in the next nine races, finishing no lower than 26th and rising to 21st in points. After finishing four laps down at Darlington, he recovered from a pit zone infraction penalty at Lowe's Motor Speedway and finished 12th. Green's best race came at the UAW Ford 500 at Talladega Superspeedway, in which he finished seventh after starting 35th, breaking a 70-race streak without a Top 10. After another Top 10 finish at Martinsville Speedway, he ended the season 28th in the final points standings.

Part time in multiple series

Green returned to Haas in 2007, and had three sixth-place finishes but was released with four races to go in the season. In 2008, he attempted four Cup races with Wood Brothers Racing and Front Row Motorsports respectively, but did not qualify for any of those races. He did qualify for three races in the Nationwide Series in the No. 31 Key Motorsports Chevy with a best finish of 28th, and ran eight races with their No. 40 truck team. His best finish was seventh at Las Vegas.

In 2009, Green continued his part-time schedule in the Nationwide Series, running for Day Racing, MSRP Motorsports, MacDonald Motorsports, and Key. His best finish was 21st at Nashville Superspeedway.

As the 2010 NASCAR season began Green had a ride in the Nationwide Series for the Camping World 300 at Daytona for Wayne Day's 05 car. Green also drove at Talladega finishing 16th and at Nashville finishing 24th for Key Motorsports. He later ran a handful of Cup Series races for Latitude 43 Motorsports and Gunselman Motorsports with a best finish of 24th. Green also started and parked Tri Star's No. 36 in the Nationwide Series.

Green started and parked for TriStar Motorsports in 2011. In his lone Sprint Cup Start of the season, he finished 43rd in the debut of the Front Row Motorsports No. 55 at New Hampshire International Speedway.

Green began the 2012 Nationwide Series schedule year driving the year in the new No. 10 for TriStar, but after an injury to Eric McClure after the 2012 Talladega race, Green was named interim driver of the No. 14. Green finished 19th in his first relief start at Darlington, but finished 32nd at Iowa and Lowe's due to a crash and an engine failure respectively. In his fourth relief start, Green posted his best finish of the year, 17th, at Dover International Speedway In his final relief start, Green finished on the lead lap in 18th at Michigan International Speedway. He has since returned to the No. 10.

Green attempted one Sprint Cup Series race in 2012, but failed to qualify at Kansas Speedway driving for Joe Falk's No. 33.

In 2013, Green returned to the start-and-park No. 10 Toyota for Tri-Star Motorsports, though he replaced McClure in the 14 for four races. Unlike the 10, Green ran full races in the 14. In 2014 at Mid-Ohio, Green was battling for the lead with eventual race winner Chris Buescher but a mechanical failure ruined his best chance at his first Nationwide Series win since 2002. He would finish 29th. In 2015, Green joined the #30 car for The Motorsports Group, replacing the fired Ron Hornaday Jr. In his debut for TMG, Green qualified 33rd and finished 40th-the best finish for TMG. Green failed to qualify in his next two attempts. Green joined Rick Ware Racing to race the season opener at Daytona, where he didn't start and park as he usually does, however engine problems caused him to finish 36th. Green drove the #17 Toyota Camry at the 2016 Subway Firecracker 250. He ran in the top 15 most of the race and avoided many wrecks including a wreck on the last lap, where he spun polesitter David Ragan. He finished seventh in the race, his first Top 10 in 11 years. Green returned to full-time Xfinity competition in 2017 driving for B. J. McLeod Motorsports. However he parted in ways with the team in the middle of the season (but returned with them at Daytona in July). He joined RSS Racing and start and parks with them.

Green completed his full 2018 season for all 33 races with RSS, mostly in the No. 93. The following year, Green competed in the first half of the 2019 NASCAR Xfinity Series season before missing the rest starting in July as he underwent rotator cuff surgery after the Kentucky race. He served as a crew chief for RSS Racing for the remainder of the year.

For 2021, Green revealed his plans for the year in a response to a fan's question on Twitter, who asked him if he had plans to compete in any Xfinity races for RSS as he did in 2020. Green stated that he did not have any races scheduled for the season, and that he would continue as a crew chief with RSS, moving from the Xfinity Series to their part-time ARCA Menards Series car, the No. 28, driven by Ryan's younger brother Kyle Sieg. On May 21, Green announced that he would be retiring from driving and crew chiefing NASCAR effective immediately. He made his announcement after the conclusion of Sieg's part-time ARCA schedule, which was the first 4 races of the season. Green's final race ended up being as crew chief for Kyle Sieg in his Xfinity Series debut at Dover.

Conflicts with fellow drivers
While in the Busch Series, Green developed a rivalry with Kevin Harvick. The drivers were prime contenders for the 2000 and 2001 championships, with Harvick beating Green out in the latter year. Green would become a teammate of Harvick's in the Winston Cup in 2002; both rejected the notion that they could not get along. While their first season together passed without incident, the second did not end well. During the 2003 Pontiac Excitement 400, Harvick ran into the rear of Green's car while Green was attempting to avoid a conflict between Ryan Newman and Ward Burton. Harvick began apologizing for the spin-out, and cameras showed that Green's car had hesitated before the collision. Green was outraged by the incident and confronted Harvick's crew chief, Todd Berrier, later saying, "Tough to be teammates when it seems like there's only one car at RCR." He was fired by Childress the next day, who said that change was needed after the relationship had gone awry.

After a relatively quiet 2004, Green took part in a much-publicized feud with his former high school schoolmate and off-track friend, Michael Waltrip during the early 2005 season, especially during races at Martinsville and Darlington, where Green and Waltrip wrecked each other on several occasions. While no penalties were assessed against the drivers, NASCAR ordered them to discontinue the incidents.

During the 2006 season, at the Chevy Rock and Roll 400, after being involved in a crash with Jimmie Johnson on lap 252, Green drove back onto the track, and, while 51 laps down while repairs were made, then slammed into Johnson just after he had spun off the bumper of Reed Sorenson on lap 322, resulting in his car being ordered to the garage for the final 78 laps (resulting in a 41st-place finish).

Motorsports career results

NASCAR
(key) (Bold – Pole position awarded by qualifying time. Italics – Pole position earned by points standings or practice time. * – Most laps led.)

Sprint Cup Series

Daytona 500

Xfinity Series

Camping World Truck Series

K&N Pro Series East

 Season still in progress.
 Ineligible for series points

ARCA Hooters SuperCar Series
(key) (Bold – Pole position awarded by qualifying time. Italics – Pole position earned by points standings or practice time. * – Most laps led.)

International Race of Champions
(key) (Bold – Pole position. * – Most laps led.)

References

External links

 
 

Living people
1962 births
Sportspeople from Owensboro, Kentucky
Racing drivers from Owensboro, Kentucky
Racing drivers from Kentucky
NASCAR drivers
NASCAR Xfinity Series champions
International Race of Champions drivers
People from Davidson, North Carolina
ARCA Menards Series drivers
Richard Childress Racing drivers
Dale Earnhardt Inc. drivers
Stewart-Haas Racing drivers
ARCA Midwest Tour drivers
Herzog Motorsports drivers